Korgun is a town in Çankırı Province in the Central Anatolia region of Turkey. It is the seat of Korgun District. Its population is 2,619 (2021).

References

Populated places in Çankırı Province
Korgun District
Towns in Turkey